Follow That Dream is an EP by American singer Elvis Presley, containing four songs from the motion picture of the same name. The EP was released by RCA Victor in May 1962.

It was simultaneously certified Gold and Platinum by the Recording Industry Association of America on March 27, 1992.

Recording and release history 
Recording sessions took place on July 2, 1961, at RCA Studio B in Nashville, Tennessee. Six songs were recorded for the film, and a distressed Presley insisted that the worst song, "Sound Advice," be omitted from release when it came time to assemble a soundtrack. "Sound Advice" would be placed on the compilation Elvis for Everyone, and a sixth soundtrack song, "A Whistling Tune," would be saved for the next film Kid Galahad, the version recorded at these sessions later released on Collectors Gold in 1991. Presley sang a few lines of "On Top of Old Smokey" in the film, but the recording was made on the movie set. The issue of quality would continue to be a sore point in his soundtrack material for the remainder of his film career.

Issued as an extended play record, the Follow That Dream soundtrack EP was released in April 1962 to coincide with the film's premiere. The record sold very well, especially for an EP in the Sixties. The title song received Top 40 radio air-play and reached No. 15 on the Billboard Hot 100 singles chart. It became a platinum record. The extended play record was the number-one EP in the UK for 20 weeks.

Track listing

Personnel
 Elvis Presley – vocals
 The Jordanaires – background vocals
 Millie Kirkham – background vocals
 Boots Randolph – saxophone
 Scotty Moore, Hank Garland – electric guitar
 Neal Matthews Jr. – acoustic guitar
 Floyd Cramer – piano
 Bob Moore – double bass
 D.J. Fontana, Buddy Harman – drums

Charts

References

External links 

 Profile at AllMusic

Film soundtracks
1962 EPs
Elvis Presley EPs
RCA Records EPs
1962 soundtrack albums
Elvis Presley soundtracks
RCA Records soundtracks
Albums produced by Hans J. Salter